Petra Santy (born 8 November 1982 in Kortrijk) is a Belgian sprint canoer who competed in the mid-2000s. At the 2004 Summer Olympics in Athens, she was eliminated in the semifinals of the K-1 500 m event.

References
Sports-Reference.com profile

1982 births
Sportspeople from Kortrijk
Belgian female canoeists
Canoeists at the 2004 Summer Olympics
Living people
Olympic canoeists of Belgium
Flemish sportspeople